The Northeastern Huskies men's soccer team represents Northeastern University in NCAA Division I college soccer. The team belongs to the Colonial Athletic Association and plays home games at Parsons Field. The Huskies are currently led by first-year head coach Chris Gbandi. The team has an all-time record 224–281–52 (.444) through the 2013 season. The Huskies have made 2 appearances in the NCAA tournament with a combined record of 2–2, having made the tournament in 2002 and again in 2012.

Head coaches
Winston Smith, 1984–1986 (9–42–2 (.185))
Keith Cammidge, 1987–1990 (22–47–1 (.321))
Turi Lonero, 1991–1995 (39–51–1 (.434))
Ed Matz, 1996–2004 (83–74–16 (.526))
Brian Ainscough, 2005–2014 (79–80–33 (.497))

Roster

Record By Year
References:

Notable players

 Harry Swartz (born 1996)

References

External links
 

 

1988 establishments in Massachusetts
Association football clubs established in 1988